WKBC-FM (97.3 FM) is a radio station broadcasting a hot adult contemporary format. Most of its programming comes from Dial Global's Hot AC. Licensed to North Wilkesboro, North Carolina and formally owned by Wilkes Broadcasting Company, it features programming from Jones Radio Networks and AP Radio.

The signal carries into the north-most portions of South Carolina including: York, Cherokee and Lancaster counties. It can also be heard clearly in parts of southwestern Virginia.

The transmitter is located about 5 miles south of North Wilkesboro atop a peak in the Brushy Mountains of southern Wilkes County.

WKBC-FM's slogan is the "Home of Appalachian Football". The station is the radio flagship of nearby Appalachian State University's sports network.

Awards
WKBC was voted the best radio station in the Charlotte listening area by the music critics of Charlotte's Creative Loafing magazine in 2006.

References

External links

=

Wilkes County, North Carolina
KBC-FM